Troms County Municipality (Kven: Tromssan fylkinkomuuni) was the regional governing administration of the old Troms county in northern Norway. It had its administration in the city of Tromsø.  It consisted of a 37-member county council and a five-member county cabinet.

County government
The Troms county council was made up of 37 representatives that are elected every four years.  The last council was elected for the 2015–2019 term.  The council essentially acts as a Parliament or legislative body for the county.  This council was led by a county mayor, and the council elected five members to be in the county cabinet which carried out the executive functions of the county.  The last cabinet was led by Willy Ørnebakk.

County council
The party breakdown of the council is as follows:

County mayor
The county council was led by a county mayor. The last county mayor of Troms was Knut Werner Hansen from the Labour Party.  He served in this office from 2011 to 2019.

Previous Troms county mayors include
Knut Werner Hansen (2011-2019)
Terje Olsen (2007-2011)
Ronald Rindestu (1995-2007)
Roger Solheim (1993-1994)
Kirsten Myklevoll (1991-1992)
Jan Henry T. Olsen (1991)
Kirsten Myklevoll (1987-1991)
William Engseth (1983-1987)
Bjarne Berg-Sæther (1963-1967)

References

 
County Municipality
County municipalities of Norway
Organisations based in Tromsø
1838 establishments in Norway
2020 disestablishments in Norway